Do Chattane is a 1974 Bollywood action film directed by G. H. Sarin.

Cast
Vikram as Rana
Rakesh Pandey as Ramzan
Asha Sachdev as Asha
Aruna Irani as Aruna
Om Prakash as Pagal Chacha
Alka as Farida
Chandrashekhar as Abdul
V. Gopal as Radheyshyam
Jankidas as Dhaniram's associate
D.K. Sapru as Dhaniram
 Joginder Shelly as Raka (as Joginder)
Sunder as Sitaram

Music

External links
 

1974 films
1970s Hindi-language films
1974 action films
Films scored by Sonik-Omi
Indian action films
Hindi-language action films